In natural language processing (NLP), a text graph is a graph representation of a text item (document, passage or sentence). It is typically created as a preprocessing step to support NLP tasks such as text condensation
term disambiguation
(topic-based) text summarization, relation extraction and textual entailment.

Representation
The semantics of what a text graph's nodes and edges represent can vary widely. Nodes for example can simply connect to tokenized words, or to domain-specific terms, or to entities mentioned in the text. The edges, on the other hand, can be between these text-based tokens or they can also link to a knowledge base.

TextGraphs Workshop series
The TextGraphs Workshop series is a series of regular academic workshops intended to encourage the synergy between the fields of natural language processing (NLP) and graph theory. The mix between the two started small, with graph theoretical framework providing efficient and elegant solutions for NLP applications that focused on single documents for part-of-speech tagging, word-sense disambiguation and semantic role labelling, got progressively larger with ontology learning and information extraction from large text collections.

The 11th edition of the workshop (TextGraphs-11) will be collocated with the Annual Meeting of Association for Computational Linguistics (ACL 2017) in Vancouver, BC, Canada.

Areas of interest
 Graph-based methods for providing reasoning and interpretation of deep learning methods
 Graph-based methods for reasoning and interpreting deep processing by neural networks,
 Explorations of the capabilities and limits of graph-based methods applied to neural networks in general
 Investigation of which aspects of neural networks are not susceptible to graph-based methods.    
 Graph-based methods for Information Retrieval, Information Extraction, and Text Mining
 Graph-based methods for word sense disambiguation,
 Graph-based representations for ontology learning,
 Graph-based strategies for semantic relations identification,
 Encoding semantic distances in graphs,
 Graph-based techniques for text summarization, simplification, and paraphrasing
 Graph-based techniques for document navigation and visualization
 Reranking with graphs
 Applications of label propagation algorithms, etc.
 New graph-based methods for NLP applications
 Random walk methods in graphs
 Spectral graph clustering
 Semi-supervised graph-based methods
 Methods and analyses for statistical networks
 Small world graphs
 Dynamic graph representations
 Topological and pretopological analysis of graphs
 Graph kernels, etc.
 Graph-based methods for applications on social networks
 Rumor proliferation
 E-reputation
 Multiple identity detection
 Language dynamics studies
 Surveillance systems, etc.
 Graph-based methods for NLP and Semantic Web
 Representation learning methods for knowledge graphs (i.e., knowledge graph embedding)
 Using graphs-based methods to populate ontologies using textual data,
 Inducing knowledge of ontologies into NLP applications using graphs,
 Merging ontologies with graph-based methods using NLP techniques.

See also 
 Bag-of-words model
 Document classification
 Document-term matrix
 Hyperlinking
 Graph database
 Wiki

References

External links
 Gabor Melli's page on text graphs Description of text graphs from a semantic processing perspective.

Natural language processing